The 2017–18 Northern Football League season was the 120th in the history of Northern Football League, a football competition in England.

The constitution for Step 5 and Step 6 divisions for 2017–18 was announced on 26 May 2017, and fixtures were released on 3 June 2017.

Division One

Division One featured 19 clubs which competed in the division last season, along with three new clubs, promoted from Division Two:
 Billingham Synthonia
 Stockton Town
 Team Northumbria

League table

Division Two

Division Two featured 18 clubs which competed in the division last season, along with three new clubs:
 Chester-le-Street Town, relegated from Division One
 Jarrow, promoted from the Wearside League
 West Allotment Celtic, relegated from Division One

Also, Blyth Town changed name to Blyth.

League table

References

External links
Northern Football League official site

Northern Football League seasons
9